Naughty Martine or The Fan (French: L'éventail) is a 1947 French comedy film directed by Emil-Edwin Reinert and starring Dany Robin, Claude Dauphin and Lucien Baroux.

The film's sets were designed by the art director Guy de Gastyne.

Cast
 Dany Robin as Martine  
 Claude Dauphin as Jacques Brévannes  
 Lucien Baroux as Le baron Saint-Yves  
 Marguerite Moreno as Mme. de Stakelberg  
 Henri Vidal as Pierre  
 Jacqueline Cadet as Madeleine Catinat 
 Robert Pizani as Le consul Alvaro Gomez  
 Pierre Dudan 
 Fritzi Scheff
 Rose Avril as Vocal  
 Nita Berger as Vocal  
 Camille Bert as Le professeur de musique  
 Colette Georges 
 Suzanne Grey 
 Jacqueline Huet 
 Albert Michel as Gustave  
 Madeleine Suffel 
 Lyska Wells

References

Bibliography 
 Alfred Krautz. International directory of cinematographers, set- and costume designers in film. Saur, 1983.

External links 
 

1947 films
French comedy films
1947 comedy films
1940s French-language films
Films directed by Emil-Edwin Reinert
Gaumont Film Company films
French black-and-white films
1940s French films